1933 German election may refer to:

 March 1933 German federal election
 November 1933 German parliamentary election